Malabar may refer to the following:

People 
 Malabars, people originating from the Malabar region of India
 Malbars or Malabars, people of Tamil origin in Réunion

Places 
 Malabar Coast, or Malabar, a region of the southwestern shoreline of India
 Dutch Malabar (1661–1795)
 Malabar District (1792–1957)
 Malabar rainforests, ecoregions
 Malabar, Indonesia
 Malabar Radio Station
 Mount Malabar, a volcano in Indonesia
 Malabar, Florida, United States
 Malabar Island, part of the Aldabra Atoll, Seychelles
 Malabar Settlement, Trinidad and Tobago
 754 Malabar, a minor planet
 Malabar, New South Wales, Australia
Malabar Headland

Transportation and military
 Malabar Express, a train service in India
 Malabar (train), a train service in Indonesia
 List of ships named Malabar
 , the name of several ships and a shore establishment of the Royal Navy
 , the name of a number of steamships
 , a US Navy World War II stores ship
 Malabar (naval exercise), a multilateral naval exercise

Other uses 
 Malabar (chewing gum), a French brand of chewing gum
 Malabar (typeface), a serif font family
 Malabar, a fictional horse in "The Rocking-Horse Winner" by D. H. Lawrence, 1926
 Malabar United F.C., an Indian football club

See also

 Malaba (disambiguation)
 Syro-Malabar (disambiguation)
 Malankara (disambiguation)
 Behramji Malabari (1853–1912), Indian poet, publicist, author, and social reformer
 Pterocarpus marsupium, or Malabar kinoa deciduous tree 
 Pachira aquatica, or Malabar chestnut, a tropical wetland tree 
 Malabar grey hornbill, a bird
 Malabar tree toad, a toad 
 Idea malabarica, or Malabar tree nymph, a butterfly